Eduard Chudnowski (born 3 January 1991) is a Belarusian former professional football player.

External links
 
 Profile at BATE website
 

1991 births
Living people
Belarusian footballers
Belarus under-21 international footballers
Association football midfielders
Belarusian expatriate footballers
Expatriate footballers in Armenia
Belarusian Premier League players
Armenian Premier League players
FC BATE Borisov players
FC Dnepr Mogilev players
FC Volna Pinsk players
FC Slonim-2017 players
FC Ararat Yerevan players
FC Kletsk players
FC Lida players
FC Smorgon players
FC Orsha players
FC Molodechno players